Ylitornio railway station is located in the municipality of Ylitornio in the Lapland Province of Finland. The station only serves passenger traffic; most trains are hauled by VR Class Dr16 locomotives. Ylitornio railway station was opened in 1927.

Railway stations in Lapland (Finland)
Railway station
Railway stations opened in 1927